Nucleoside diphosphate-linked moiety X motif 6 is a protein that in humans is encoded by the NUDT6 gene.

FGF2 (MIM 134920) is a highly conserved, multifunctional heparin-binding growth factor involved in neuroectoderm development, angiogenesis, and wound healing. 

Elevated levels of FGF2 are associated with proliferation of smooth muscle in atherosclerosis and with proliferation of tumors. The FGF2 antisense gene, NUDT6, may regulate FGF2 expression.[supplied by OMIM]

References

Further reading

Nudix hydrolases